Wilskerke is a small rural village in Belgium, situated in de Polder region, about 1.5 km from the coastline. In 1977, it became a part (deelgemeente) of the municipality of Middelkerke.

Populated places in West Flanders
Sub-municipalities of Middelkerke